Gleicher is a surname. Notable people with the surname include:

Elizabeth L. Gleicher (born 1954), American lawyer and jurist
Norbert Gleicher (born 1948), Polish-born American gynecologist
Martha Gleicher, a name used by Martha Farkas Glaser (1921–2014), American music manager